The following is a list of the largest banks in North America by total assets as of Dec. 31, 2018. Information from 2019 S&P Global Market Intelligence, and all of the largest banks on the continent are based in two countries - the United States and Canada.

See also
 List of largest banks
 List of largest banks in the United States
 List of largest banks in the Americas
 List of largest banks in Latin America
 List of largest banks in Southeast Asia

References

Banks of the Americas
North America-related lists